Piusa River Valley Landscape Conservation Area is a nature park which is located in Võru County, Estonia.

The area of the nature park is 1212 ha.

The protected area was founded in 1962 to protect Piusa River's valley.

References

Nature reserves in Estonia
Geography of Võru County